The Diocese of Mackenzie River was a short-lived diocese of the Ecclesiastical Province of Rupert's Land of the Anglican Church of Canada.

It was created in 1884 by splitting the Diocese of Athabasca into two, and was itself subdivided in 1891 to create the Diocese of Selkirk (later renamed Yukon). The remainder was merged into the Diocese of Arctic  when the latter diocese was created in 1933.

Bishops of Mackenzie River
 1884–1891: William Bompas
 1891–1907: William Reeve
 1907–1912: interregnum
 1912–1926: James Lucas
 1928–1933: William Geddes

References

Mackenzie River, Anglican Diocese of